= Gajapati, Karnataka =

Village in Belgaum district, Karnataka, India

Gajapati is a village located in Belgaum district, in the southern state of Karnataka, India.

== Demographics ==
As of 2011 Census of India, the village had a population of 1633 with a literacy rate of 74.07%.
